Catherine Russell (born 1956) is an American stage actress, professor, general manager, and producer. She is best known for having never taken a sick or vacation day in the Off-Broadway play Perfect Crime since its opening in 1987. Russell also holds the world record for the most performances as the same character (Margaret Thorne Brent) in that play.

Russell's longevity has been covered by People and Entertainment Weekly. She has shared her tips and tricks to her success with Women's Health. She is a Christian Scientist.

Career 
Russell debuted Off-Broadway in 1980 as Nicola Davies in Stephen Poliakoff's City Sugar and has also appeared Off-Broadway in Miss Shumann's Quartet, A Resounding Twinkle, The Award And Other Plays and Creeps. She has also appeared in New York as Masha in Three Sisters, Rose in Incommunicado, Edie in Lunch Girls, Missy in Home on the Range, and Cathy Cakes in Inserts. While performing in Perfect Crime, she has also managed to appear on-stage (after 10:30pm or on her nights off) in The Queen of the Parting Shot, Pas de Deux, Stages, I'll See You In Hell, Guardian Star and, most recently, Some Enchanted Evening as well as several films including Soundman and Remedy.

Russell teaches at NYU and Baruch College. She is also the general manager of The Theater Center and an executive producer of The Fantasticks. She co-produced Piggy Nation the Musical.

References

American actresses
Living people
1956 births
Cornell University alumni
Place of birth missing (living people)
21st-century American actresses